Rebel is the sixth album by American hard rock band Lynch Mob.

Track listing

Personnel 
 Oni Logan – vocals
 George Lynch – guitar
 Jeff Pilson – bass guitar
 Brian Tichy – drums

References 

Lynch Mob (band) albums
2015 albums